Inca Manco Cápac International Airport , known as Aeropuerto Internacional Inca Manco Cápac in Spanish, is an extremely high elevation airport serving in the city of Juliaca in Peru,  west of Titicaca Lake. Airport operations are run by Corporación Peruana de Aeropuertos y Aviación Comercial S.A. (CORPAC), the government entity that oversees management of Peruvian airports. Despite being classified as international, Inca Manco Cápac International Airport does not feature any scheduled international nonstop flights. The airport has one of the longest runways in Latin America and the longest one in Peru.

The airport was named after Inca Manco Cápac, founder of the Inca civilization in Cusco.

Airlines and destinations 

The airport is currently served by the following airlines:

See also 
Transport in Peru
List of airports in Peru
List of highest commercial airports

References

External links 
OurAirports - Juliaca
SkyVector Aeronautical Charts

Airports in Peru
Buildings and structures in Puno Region